John Hunting may refer to:
 John Hunting (referee), English football referee
 John Hunting (settler), Massachusetts settler
 John R. Hunting, American philanthropist